Fàn Zhěn (范縝, hanyupinyin Fàn Zhěn) (c. 450 - 515) was a Chinese philosopher, politician, and writer. He was an atheist of the Southern Qi Dynasty, remembered today for his treatise Shén Miè Lùn (simplified Chinese 神灭论, traditional Chinese 神滅論, "On the Annihilation of the Soul").

Fàn was born into a poor family in today's Zhumadian, Henan province. He was a member of a cadet branch of the elite Fàn family, and became a high-ranking official thanks to his erudition. In response to the prevailing Buddhist movement of his time, he wrote Shen Mie Lun in 507, a treatise denying the ideas of reincarnation and body-soul dualism. A courtier tried to persuade Fàn to give up his opinion, in exchange for a higher official title, but Fàn refused. Emperor Wu of Liang, displeased with the subject of Fàn's work, made an imperial decree (敕答臣下神滅論) to criticize the treatise, and ordered 64 of his courtiers to answer Fàn back. 75 pamphlets were produced against Shen Mie Lun. Fàn did not surrender, though, and wrote back to hold fast to his opinion. The debate failed to disprove the dissertation, and Fàn Zhěn was exiled by the emperor as a heretic. 

In Shen Mie Lun, Fàn writes that:
"The soul is the body; the body is the soul. There is the body, there is the soul; when the body annihilates, so does the soul."（神即形也，形即神也。是以形存則神存，形謝則神滅也。）
"The body is the substance of the soul; the soul is the effect of the body. That means the body refers to the substance, and the soul the effect. The body and the soul is one."（形者神之質，神者形之用，是則形稱其質，神言其用，形之與神，不得相異也。）
"The soul to the substance is like sharpness to a blade; the body to the effect is like a blade to its sharpness. The blade and its sharpness do not share the same name. However, there is no blade without its sharpness, and no sharpness without the blade. As there is no sharpness without a knife, it is impossible for a soul to exist without its body."（神之於質，猶利之於刃，形之於用，猶刃之於利，利之名非刃也，刃之名非利也。然而舍利無刃，舍刃無利，未聞刃沒而利存，豈容形亡而神在。）

Bibliography

External links
 Biography and text of Shen Mie Lun

515 deaths
6th-century Chinese philosophers
5th-century births
5th-century Chinese philosophers
Chinese atheism activists
Atheist philosophers
Chinese essayists
Chinese non-fiction writers
Critics of Buddhism
Critics of religions
Liu Song dynasty people
Northern and Southern dynasties philosophers
Northern and Southern dynasties politicians
Philosophers of mind
Philosophers of religion
Political philosophers
Pre–17th-century atheists
Southern Qi politicians
Southern Qi writers